AN/TPQ-53 Quick Reaction Capability Radar is a mobile active electronically scanned array counter-battery radar system manufactured by Lockheed Martin.
The radar is specifically designed to locate the firing positions of both rocket and mortar launchers.

Nomenclature 

Per the Joint Electronics Type Designation System (JETDS), the nomenclature AN/TPQ-53 is thus derived:

 "AN/" originally indicated Army/Navy (Marines), but is now used to indicate the JETDS system.
 "T" for 'transportable', indicating it is carried by a vehicle but is not an integral part of said vehicle (compare with 'V' for vehicle-mounted).
 "P" indicating a radar.
 "Q" for a special-purpose/multipurpose radar, in this case counter-battery.
 "53" is the model number of this radar within the TPQ radar family.

History
The TPQ-53 radar's delivery on 2 July 2009 followed its successful live-fire performance testing against indirect fire from mortars, artillery and rockets from a simulated enemy. The system has been tested and has been accepted by the US Army.
TPQ-53 radar systems will replace the aging TPQ-36 and TPQ-37 medium-range radars now in the Army's inventory. In addition to its counter-fire and counter-drone missions, 

Prior to September 2011 This system was known as EQ-36 Counterfire Target Acquisition Radar.

The AN/TPQ-53 is the most advanced counter-fire radar of the US Army, with a detection range of  38 miles / 60 km, operating in the S-band range for enhanced accuracy.

In June 2013 the United States Army exercised a contract option to finish out the total production of 51 systems. After a contract award 24 April 2017 has completed production, the Army will hold more than 170 such systems. In April 2020 the first GaN based AN/TPQ-53 was delivered to the U.S. Army

After Russian-backed separatists started operating tanks in Eastern Ukraine, the U.S. started sending military items to Ukraine, including 20 AN/TPQ-53 radar systems in 2015. As a result, Ukraine's units thus equipped had casualty rates decline from 47 percent to around 18 percent. Ukrainian combat expertise with the system led to their providing training to U.S. forces.

See also
ARTHUR (military)
AN/TPS-80 Ground/Air Task Oriented Radar
Swathi Weapon Locating Radar
Red Color
Type 704 Radar

Notes

External links 
(7 July 2009) U.S. Army Receives First EQ-36 Counterfire Target Acquisition Radar System US Army acquisition
LockMart product page

Ground radars
Military radars of the United States
Raytheon Company products
Lockheed Martin
Weapon Locating Radar
Military electronics of the United States
Targeting (warfare)